Joshua Fielden may refer to:
Joshua Fielden (cotton manufacturer) (1748–1811), founder of the cotton spinning business Fielden Brothers of Todmorden, Yorkshire, father of John Fielden
Joshua Fielden (politician) (1826–1887), grandson of the above and MP for the Eastern Division of the West Riding of Yorkshire